Chora may refer to:

Places

Greece
Chora (meaning "Town" in Greek), is often used as the name of the main town on an island, following the common practice in Greece when the name of the island itself is the same as the name of the principal town.
 Chora, old capital of the island of Alonnisos
 Chora, village on the island of Folegandros
 Chora, Ios, capital of the island of Ios
 Chora, Messinia, a small town in Messenia in the Peloponnese
 Chora, principal town on the island of Mykonos
 Chora, an alternative name for Naxos city on the island of Naxos
 Chora, principal town on the island of Patmos
 Chora Sfakion, a town on the south coast of Crete
 Chora, the main town of the island of Kythira

Other
 Chora (software), a web-based CVS repository viewer
 Miura Chora (1729–1780), Japanese poet
 Chora (woreda), a district in the Oromia Region of Ethiopia
 Chora, Iran, village in Gilan Province
 Chora District, in the Uruzgan province of Afghanistan
 Chora, Afghanistan, the capital of the Chora District above.

See also 
 Chora Church, a Byzantine church in Istanbul
 Khôra, Greek term used by Plato to describe neither being nor nonbeing